Borden Ladner Gervais LLP (abbreviated as BLG) is a leading, full-service law firm in Canada. With almost two hundred years of history going back to the 1823 founding of McMaster Gervais, it now has offices in Toronto, Montréal, Vancouver, Ottawa, and Calgary. About 700 lawyers, intellectual property agents and other professionals are associated with the firm. BLG is governed by a national council composed of partners from across Canada. Sean Weir served as the firm's first National Managing Partner until 2018, and was succeeded in the position by John Murphy of the Montreal office.

In 2019, BLG was named a leading law firm in The Canadian Legal Lexpert® Directory, with 221 lawyers recognized as leaders. The firm was recognized as Band 1 in 11 practice groups in the 2017 edition of Chambers Global, and is known for its  practices in international trade, energy, investment, employment and labour, healthcare, shipping, construction, and procurement law.

Former justices of Canada's Supreme Court Justice Thomas Cromwell, who authored the landmark Bhasin v Hrynew decision on the common law duty of good faith, and Justice Louise Arbour, currently jurist in residence at BLG, joined the firm in 2017 and 2014, respectively.

Over the years, the firm has produced two Prime Ministers, an Attorney General, appellate court justices, law school deans, an ambassador to the United States, and directors of numerous national corporations. It has represented many of Canada's most well-known blue chip companies including Hudson's Bay Co., Canadian Pacific Railway, Bank of Montreal, Prudential Life, Alcan, Royal Trust, Bell Canada, General Electric, DuPont and Dominion Textiles. The firm was also counsel to the Prince of Wales.

History
On March 1, 2000, the law firms of McMaster Gervais of Montreal, Borden & Elliot of Toronto, Ladner Downs of Vancouver, Howard Mackie of Calgary, and Scott & Aylen of Ottawa,  merged to create BLG.

In July 2002, BLG strengthened its corporate securities practice with the acquisition of the Calgary-based law firm Armstrong Perkins Hudson LLP  —the then-largest securities boutique in Western Canada.

In 2003, BLG added its sixth office when it was joined by the lawyers from Armstrong & Associates in Waterloo Region.  The firm was a Waterloo Region intellectual property law boutique. Recently, in January 2008, the firm of Shortt Hanbridge Richardson and Welch joined the Waterloo Region office of BLG. By the end of 2014, BLG had closed its Waterloo office.

Founding Firms
The Toronto firm Borden & Elliot was founded on January 20, 1936, by lawyers Henry Borden and Beverly Vallack Elliot.  Henry, at the outbreak of WWII, was appointed to the War Supply Board in Ottawa and in 1942, was appointed chairman of the War Time Industries Control Board.  Over the following three decades, the firm experienced rapid expansion resulting in many name changes. Eventually, the firm's name was changed back to Borden & Elliot in 1973. At the time of the merger in 2000, Borden & Elliot was a full-service firm with one of the largest litigation practices in the country, and employed 668 people including more than 230 professionals.

The Montréal firm McMaster Gervais was founded in 1823 when the Honourable William Badgley opened his law practice at the age of 22. Badgley went on to become Attorney General for Lower Canada in 1847, and in 1853 became the first dean of McGill's law school, Canada's oldest.  Badgley's first partner at the firm, John Abbott, became Prime Minister of Canada in 1891. At the time of the merger, McMaster Gervais employed 280 people, including 110 professionals. McMaster Gervais was a result of a 1998 merger of McMaster Meighen and Mackenzie Gervais.

The Vancouver firm Ladner Downs was founded in 1911. A few years earlier, in 1909, Leon Ladner was the President of the Vancouver Law Students Society that first proposed opening a provincial law school in Vancouver, a proposal that came to fruition 36 years later when the UBC Faculty of Law opened in 1945. And, in 1917, Ladner sat in on the parliamentary committee that drafted the Income War Tax Act - Canada's first income tax act. Leon's son, Thomas Ladner, built and expanded Ladner Downs into one of the leading law firms in British Columbia.  At the time of the merger, the firm employed 318 people, including 110 professionals. Kim Campbell, Canada's first female Prime Minister, practiced at Ladner Downs prior to the firm's merger.

The fully bilingual Ottawa firm Scott & Aylen was founded in 1952. At the time of the merger,  the firm employed 168 people, including 62 professionals. The firm brought together lawyers, patent agents and trademark agents under one roof. Scott & Aylen co-founder Cuthbert Scott's son, David W. Scott (the first non-American to be elected President of the American College of Trial Lawyers ), continues to practice at BLG's Ottawa office today and represents the fourth successive generation of the Scott family to practice law in the Ottawa area. The other co-founder, John A. Aylen Q.C. practised with the firm until he was 89 years old; his son, John G. Aylen Q.C. recently retired from BLG at the age of 86, three years short of his father's record. John G. Aylen's son, David Aylen, is also a lawyer who practised IP with Scott & Aylen for 15 years until he joined another firm in 1998. David Aylen is now a global IP specialist in Russia.

The Calgary law firm Howard, Mackie was founded in 1888 by William L. Bernard, QC, and was one of the largest in Western Canada. In 1993, led by Doug Mitchell, Howard, Mackie established the Howard, Mackie Awards (which were later renamed the BLG Awards). At the time of the merger, the firm employed 150 people, including 66 professionals.

Awards and accolades
In 2011 – for the fifth consecutive year – BLG was recognized as a "Go-To Law Firm" for Fortune 500 companies, and had the most number of lawyers in Canada with a Martindale-Hubbell Peer Review Rating.

The firm supports a variety of activities by providing pro bono legal services, fundraising and volunteer programs. In 2010, BLG was recognized by the 2010 Canadian Pro Bono Awards with the Canadian National Law Firm Award for contribution to the delivery of pro bono legal services across the country.

Notable lawyers
David Freiheit
Gar Knutson
Douglas Mitchell
 Ari Taub

References

External links
 Borden Ladner Gervais Website
 Borden Ladner Gervais on Twitter
 

Law firms of Canada
Law firms established in 2000
2000 establishments in Canada